Thermal Work Limit (TWL) is defined as the limiting (or maximum) sustainable metabolic rate that well-hydrated, acclimatized individuals can maintain in a specific thermal environment, within a safe deep body core temperature (< ) and sweat rate (<  per hour). The index is designed for self-paced workers and does not rely on estimation of actual metabolic rates, a process that is difficult and subject to considerable error. The index has been introduced into the United Arab Emirates and Australia, resulting in a substantial and sustained fall in the incidence of heat illness in the latter.

History 
The idea of a thermal work limit (TWL) was developed by Dr. Graham Bates and Dr. Derrick Brake in 1997. Over the past 80 years, many heat stress indices have been developed to assist with the management of heat stress problems. Some of these have been developed for particular industries and empirically derived such as ISO 7933 and WBGT.  These indices required estimation of metabolic rate but failed to consider the direct measurement of wind speed, reduction of work rate, location and time shift during work and removal of clothing, making these indices not accurate for self-paced and acclimatized workers.
The need for a heat stress index designed primarily for self-paced workers has led to the development of the thermal work limit (TWL). TWL and its accompanying management protocols have been introduced into several industrial operations where workers are subject to thermal stress. Since the introduction of TWL-based policies in the Australian mining industry, the amount of man-hours lost due to serious heat illness has fallen from 12 million to 6 million, and the amount lost due to all heat illness incidences has fallen from 31 million to 18 million.

Theory 
The basic purpose of the thermal work limit index is to calculate the maximum metabolic rate, in watts of metabolic heat per square meter of body surface area, that can be continuously expended in a particular thermal environment, in order to keep the body within safe physiological limits. The TWL is an integrated measure of the dry bulb, wet bulb, wind speed and radiant heat. From these variables, and taking into consideration the type of clothing worn and acclimatization state of the worker, the TWL predicts the maximum level of work that can be carried out in a given environment, without workers exceeding a safe core body temperature  and sweat rate. In excessively hot conditions, the index can also determine the safe work duration, thus providing guidelines for work/rest cycling. Sweat rates are also calculated, so the level of fluid replacement necessary to avoid dehydration can be established.
The thermal work limit algorithm builds on work originated by Mitchell and Whillier, who developed an index “specific cooling power,” which subsequently became known as “air cooling power” (ACP).

Methodology 
To determine TWL the following must be measured:
	Dry Bulb Temperature (ambient air temperature) (in degrees °C)
	Wet Bulb Temperature (determined by the humidity/evaporation) (in degrees °C)
	Globe Temperature (determined by the radiant heat) (in degrees °C)
	Wind speed in meters per second
The thermal environment can be classified on the basis of TWL into the working zones shown in the adjacent image.

Application 

The TWL heat stress index is the heat stress index that has been included in the Abu Dhabi EHSMS code of practice for the management of Heat Stress. TWL gives a measure of the maximum safe work rate for the environmental conditions present at a worksite. If TWL is too low then even low rates of work cannot safely be carried out continuously and extra rest breaks and other precautions are needed to ensure worker safety.

References

External links 
TWL instrument
TWL calculator

Safety equipment
Occupational safety and health